Shanxi Construction Engineering Group Corporation is a Chinese construction engineering contractor. It is the 23rd largest construction engineering contractor in China based on revenue in 2015.

Projects
The company mainly works in China but completes a number of Chinese development projects abroad.

  Bandaranaike Memorial International Conference Hall in Colombo, Sri Lanka
  Kiribathgoda to Kadawatha of Colombo to Kandy road
  Sligoville mini-stadium - Miniature stadium and sports complex was a gift from the government of China

References

External links

Construction and civil engineering companies of China
Companies based in Taiyuan